James "Jerry" A. Jodice from J. A. Jodice & Associates, Manchester-by-the-Sea, Massachusetts was named Fellow of the Institute of Electrical and Electronics Engineers (IEEE) in 2015 for contributions to the testing of protective relays.

References

20th-century births
Living people
American engineers
Fellow Members of the IEEE
Year of birth missing (living people)
Place of birth missing (living people)
American electrical engineers